Harvey Wilson (born 9 December 1949) is a New Zealand equestrian. He competed at the 1988 Summer Olympics and the 1992 Summer Olympics.

References

External links
 

1949 births
Living people
New Zealand male equestrians
Olympic equestrians of New Zealand
Equestrians at the 1988 Summer Olympics
Equestrians at the 1992 Summer Olympics
Sportspeople from Whanganui